is a mountain located in the Daisetsuzan Volcanic Group of the Ishikari Mountains, Hokkaidō, Japan. It is in the Daisetsuzan Volcanic Group.

Pippu

ja:比布岳